Rockefeller Capital Management is an independent wealth management and financial services firm, founded in 2018. The firm offers family office, asset management, and strategic advisory services to high-net-worth individuals and families, institutions, and corporations. Its president and CEO is Greg Fleming.

The firm is headquartered in Rockefeller Plaza in New York City, and has over 40 offices in the US as well as an office in London.

Company history
In October 2017, Rockefeller Financial Services, the parent company of Rockefeller & Co., announced the imminent creation of Rockefeller Capital Management, and the appointment of former Wall Street executive Greg Fleming as its founding CEO. The new firm resulted from the acquisition by Viking Global Investors of a majority stake in Rockefeller & Co., a wealth-management multi-family office and registered investment adviser firm set up by the Rockefeller family in 1979. The original firm was established by John D. Rockefeller in 1882 as the first full-service single family office in the United States, according to Deloitte, and according to the Financial Times, as "one of the world's first family offices dedicated to investing [personal] wealth." Rockefeller & Co changed its business name to Rockefeller Financial in 2010.

Rockefeller Capital Management began operations in March 2018. Fleming began aggressively recruiting staff  from the major Wall Street full-service brokerage firms. He also made acquisitions, and opened branch offices in cities across the United States, with locations in 14 states by 2021. In 2022 the firm had over 40 offices in the United States and an office in London. As of 2022, the firm was responsible for over $90 billion in client assets across its three business divisions – Rockefeller Global Family Office, Rockefeller Asset Management and Rockefeller Strategic Advisory.

In the fall of 2019, the firm acquired Financial Clarity, a multi-family office wealth-management firm in Silicon Valley. In early 2021, it acquired Whitnell & Co., a similar firm in the Chicago area, from Associated Banc-Corp. In 2022, the firm acquired the wealth management business of Spearhead Capital, a financial services firm based in Florida.

Services
Rockefeller Global Family Office
Rockefeller Global Family Office is a division offering a variety of financial services, including wealth management, family office services, trust and fiduciary services, and wealth and strategy advising.

Rockefeller Strategic Advisory
Rockefeller Strategic Advisory provides strategic advice to high-net-worth families, family offices, individuals, and corporations on matters such as mergers, acquisitions, divestitures, real estate, raising capital, and sports franchises.

Rockefeller Asset Management
Rockefeller Asset Management is the firm's asset management division. According to CityWire, the division provides "equity and fixed income strategies across active, multi-factor passive, and thematic approaches."

In March 2018, Rockefeller Asset Management joined the United Nations Environment Programme Finance Initiative, stating  its intent to build a concentrated long-term portfolio emphasizing environmental, social, and governance (ESG) factors. In May 2019 it launched two ESG-driven investment funds: the Rockefeller US ESG Equity Fund; and the Rockefeller Global ESG Equity Fund, a UCITS fund domiciled in Europe. In January 2021 Rockefeller Asset Management, in partnership with Bloomberg, launched the Bloomberg Rockefeller U.S. All Cap Multi-Factor ESG Improvers Index, which ranks a company's improvement on ESG issues relative to industry peers, while also taking quality and low volatility into account, in addition to incorporating shareholder engagement techniques.

Governance
Former Wall Street senior executive Greg Fleming is the founding president and CEO of the company.

The firm is majority owned by the private-equity arm of Viking Global Investors, and Viking portfolio manager Brian Kaufmann is on the Rockefeller Capital Management board. Approximately 10% the firm is owned by Rockefeller family members.

References

External links
Official site

American companies established in 2018
Financial services companies established in 2018
Banks established in 2018
Investment management companies of the United States
Institutions founded by the Rockefeller family
Rockefeller family